The Gliding Heritage Centre (GHC) is a collection of vintage gliders based at Lasham Airfield, Hampshire, UK.

Origins
Christopher Wills, the son of Philip Wills, founded the Vintage Glider Club in 1973. He died on 4 May 2011 but left a bequest of £100,000 to build a hangar to house vintage gliders plus his Steinadler. A group of enthusiasts decided to create a Gliding Heritage Centre which could be visited by members of the public in a building called The Chris Wills Memorial Hangar. It is a registered charity No 1148972.

After raising more money and with much volunteer work, the first hangar was opened on the 4th August 2013 during the 41st International Vintage Glider Club rally that was held at Lasham that year. Further fund raising allowed the building of a second hangar to house the ever increasing collection of gliders. Hangar 2 was officially opened on 25 August 2018.

A dedicated workshop is almost complete following a further bequest from Trish Williams. This will allow some of the aircraft in the collection to remain airworthy, as well as restoration and conservation of the rest of the fleet. The workshop will be used for the teaching of the skills required to restore and repair wooden gliders, as these skills are becoming increasingly scarce. It is planned to add a viewing area in the workshop to allow the public to see work that is being done.

Collection
Public tours of the museum were scheduled at 2:00 every Sunday with the starting point in the club-house of Lasham Gliding Society, but COVID-19 has caused a suspension.

	

Other gliders in private ownership are also made available to the collection from time to time.

See also
List of aerospace museums

References

External links

 
 YouTube video
 Aviation Journal

Aerospace museums in England
Museums in Hampshire
Glider aircraft
Sailplanes
Charities based in the United Kingdom